The 2020 UMass Minutemen football team represented the University of Massachusetts Amherst in the 2020 NCAA Division I FBS football season. The Minutemen competed as an independent. They were led by second-year head coach Walt Bell.

UMass originally announced on August 11, 2020, that they would not play football in the fall over concerns related to the COVID-19 pandemic. This decision was reversed on September 21, as UMass announced that opponents would be announced "as they become official". Although the Minutemen's home stadium was Warren McGuirk Alumni Stadium, all games there were cancelled; the team played only away games in 2020. 

The Minutemen finished the abridged season winless, at 0–4, and were outscored by their opponents by a combined total of 161 to 12.

Previous season

The Minutemen finished the 2019 season with a record of 1–11.

Preseason

Award watch lists

Listed in the order that they were released.

Schedule
UMass went 0–4, scoring 12 total points while allowing 161 points by their opponents.

Game summaries

at Georgia Southern

at Marshall

at Florida Atlantic

at Liberty

References

UMass
UMass Minutemen football seasons
College football winless seasons
UMass Minutemen football